In cosmology, flatness is a property of a space without curvature. Such a space is called a "flat space" or Euclidean space.

Whether the universe is “flat″ could determine its ultimate fate; whether it will expand forever, or ultimately collapse back into itself. The geometry of spacetime has been measured by the Wilkinson Microwave Anisotropy Probe (WMAP) to be nearly flat. According to the WMAP 5-year results and analysis, “WMAP determined that the universe is flat, from which it follows that the mean energy density in the universe is equal to the critical density (within a 1% margin of error). This is equivalent to a mass density of 9.9 × 10−30 g/cm3, which is equivalent to only 5.9 protons per cubic meter.” The WMAP data are consistent with a flat geometry, with Ω = 1.02 +/- 0.02.

See also
 Flatness problem

References

External links
 http://archive.ncsa.uiuc.edu/Cyberia/Cosmos/FlatnessProblem.html

Physical cosmology